Panekavu Bhagavati Shastha Temple is a temple in Perumbavoor, Ernakulam District, Kerala. The place where the temple stands has been considered holy, as this place was the hot spot for performing all rituals and poojas under the able management of a single person by the name "Chakyar". Over time, the sacred land was inherited by family members, generations after generations, but eventually had to be sold to an industrial company.

However, it was said that Devi had already decided upon the fate of the holy land, and the land was then bought by a devotee named Sri. Sunil Dath with the intention of preserving the rich devotional and cultural heritage of the sacred land.

Under the able guidance of a renowned astrologer, Sri. Gopalakrishna Varrier,  Sri. Dath built separate shrines of Bhagvathy (known as Vana Durga), Sasthavu (Lord Ayyapan), and Bhadra Kali, along with Sarppathara and Rakshasa. The major factor which was strictly kept in mind while building the temple was the Vastu-Shastra principles. Today, Sri. Sunil Dath has succeeded in retaining the sacredness of the land with the same effervescence as it was during the time of its ancestors.

The "Punaprathista" (process of setting up of the shrines at their respective places) was done by Tantri Kashankottu Manakkal Brahma Sri Damodaran Namboodiripaadu and Narayanan Namboodiri Padu. Since then, poojas are being done on a regular basis during the first Friday and Saturday of every English month.

The beauty of the Temple's location is enhanced by the presence of a natural stream flowing by the side of the main temple. The stream has been dedicated to Lord Ayyapan, as the green stream resembles the Pamba River in Sabarimala, which is considered to be the abode of Lord Ayyapan. By the blessings of the Lord, the stream flows all throughout the year.

References

Hindu temples in Ernakulam district

Bhagavathi temples in Kerala